The Pennsylvania State Athletic Conference (PSAC) is a college athletic conference affiliated with the National Collegiate Athletic Association (NCAA) at the Division II level. The conference was originally formed in 1951 as the State Teachers Conference, and was temporarily named the Pennsylvania State Teachers College Conference in 1956 before being named the Pennsylvania State Athletic Conference in 1964. The conference is currently composed of 17 full-time members within Pennsylvania and 1 in West Virginia. The conference headquarters are located in Lock Haven, Pennsylvania and staffed by a commissioner, two assistant commissioners, and a director of media relations.

History
The Pennsylvania State System of Higher Education organized the conference in 1951 to promote competition in men's sports amongst the system's 14 universities. In 1977, following growing interest, the conference was expanded to offer competition in women's sports. From its inception, each conference member selected its own competitive division within the NCAA (I, II, or III). In 1980, however, the presidents voted to reclassify the entire conference to Division II within the NCAA.

Membership remained unchanged until the conference announced on June 18, 2007, that it had invited three private universities—Gannon University and Mercyhurst College in Erie, Pennsylvania and C.W. Post of Brookville, New York—to join the conference. Gannon and Mercyhurst left the Great Lakes Intercollegiate Athletic Conference to join the PSAC, effective July 1, 2008. C.W. Post became an associate member for football and field hockey.

In 2010, Seton Hill University was accepted to join the conference as an associate member for field hockey. With the additional transition of West Chester's program from Division I to Division II, the number of teams competing in field hockey increased from 10 to 12 for the 2011 season.

On August 19, 2012, the PSAC announced that Seton Hill and the University of Pittsburgh at Johnstown, formerly members of the West Virginia Intercollegiate Athletic Conference (WVIAC), would become full members beginning with the 2013–14 school year. This announcement was fallout from a split in the WVIAC that ultimately led to the formation of the Mountain East Conference (MEC). Although Seton Hill was one of the schools that initially broke away from the WVIAC, it chose not to join the MEC. The arrival of these two schools brought the PSAC to 18 full members, making it the largest NCAA all-sports conference in terms of membership at that time. While two other conferences briefly expanded to more members, the D-II Lone Star Conference to 19 in 2019–20 and the D-III USA South Athletic Conference to the same number in 2021–22, both have since reduced their memberships to less than 18, once again giving the PSAC the largest membership of any NCAA all-sports conference.

In March 2018, charter member Cheyney University of Pennsylvania, facing crises in enrollment, graduation rates, and finances, announced that it would leave NCAA Division II and the PSAC at the end of the 2017–18 school year. The school had dropped football in December 2017.

Later that year, the conference announced that it would expand into West Virginia, bringing in Shepherd University from the MEC as a full member effective with the 2019–20 school year. Shepherd is the first full PSAC member outside of Pennsylvania.

Role in Division I conference realignment
The PSAC played a little-known but nonetheless significant role in the history of NCAA Division I conference realignment. In 1986, the conference was seeking a way out of a football scheduling conundrum. The PSAC had 14 members at the time, and had been split into divisions for decades. One of the methods it historically used to determine a football champion involved a championship game between the winners of its two divisions. However, due to NCAA limits on regular-season games, every PSAC team had to leave a schedule spot open, with only the two division winners getting to play all of their allowed regular-season games. Then-conference commissioner Tod Eberle asked Dick Yoder, then athletic director at West Chester and member of the Division II council, to draft NCAA legislation that would allow the PSAC to play a conference title game that would be exempt from regular-season limits. The initial draft required that a qualifying league have 14 members and play a round-robin schedule within each division; only the PSAC then qualified.

Before Yoder formally introduced the proposal, he was approached by the Central Intercollegiate Athletic Association, which was interested in co-sponsoring the legislation because it was also split into football divisions and wanted the option of a championship game. Since the CIAA then had 12 members, Yoder changed the legislation to require 12 members instead of 14. Although at the time all NCAA legislation had to be approved by the entire membership, regardless of divisional alignment, the proposal passed with little notice. It was generally seen as a non-issue by Division I-A (now FBS) schools since no conference in that group then had more than 10 members. While the PSAC planned to stage its first exempt title game in 1988, it decided against doing so at that time because the D-II playoffs expanded from 8 to 16 teams that season, and it feared that the result of a title game could cost the league a playoff berth. The new NCAA rule would not see its first use until the Southeastern Conference took advantage of it by expanding to 12 members in 1991 and launching a title game the following year. In 2014, then-Sports Illustrated writer Andy Staples said that the rule "helped dictate the terms of conference realignment for more than 20 years."

Chronological timeline
 1951 – The Pennsylvania State Athletic Conference (PSAC) was founded as the State Teachers Conference of Pennsylvania (STCP). Charter members included Bloomsburg State Teachers College (now Bloomsburg University of Pennsylvania), California State Teachers College (now Pennsylvania Western University California), Cheyney State Teachers College (now Cheyney University of Pennsylvania), Clarion State Teachers College (now Pennsylvania Western University Clarion), East Stroudsburg State Teachers College (now East Stroudsburg University of Pennsylvania), Edinboro State Teachers College (now Pennsylvania Western University Edinboro), Indiana State Teachers College (now Indiana University of Pennsylvania), Kutztown State Teachers College (now Kutztown University of Pennsylvania), Lock Haven State Teachers College (now Lock Haven University of Pennsylvania), Mansfield State Teachers College (now Mansfield University of Pennsylvania), Millersville State Teachers College (now Millersville University of Pennsylvania), Shippensburg State Teachers College (now Shippensburg University of Pennsylvania), Slippery Rock State Teachers College (now Slippery Rock University of Pennsylvania) and West Chester State Teachers College (now West Chester University of Pennsylvania), effective beginning the 1951–52 academic year.
 1956 – The STCP has been rebranded as the Pennsylvania State Teachers College Conference (PSTCC), effective in the 1956–57 academic year.
 1964 – The PSTCC has been rebranded as the Pennsylvania State Athletic Conference (PSAC), effective in the 1964–65 academic year.
 1980 – The PSAC had joined the National Collegiate Athletic Association (NCAA) at the Division II ranks, transitioning from the National Association of Intercollegiate Athletics (NAIA), effective in the 1980–81 academic year.
 2008 – Gannon University and Mercyhurst University joined the PSAC, effective in the 2008–09 academic year.
 2008 – Long Island University–Post (LIU–Post) joined the PSAC as an affiliate member for field hockey and football, effective in the 2008 fall season (2008–09 academic year). 
 2011 – Seton Hill University joined the PSAC as an affiliate member for field hockey, effective in the 2011 fall season (2011–12 academic year).
 2013 – LIU Post left the PSAC as an affiliate member for field hockey and football, effective after the 2012 fall season (2012–13 academic year). 
 2013 – The University of Pittsburgh at Johnstown joined the PSAC (along with Seton Hill for all sports), effective in the 2013–14 academic year.
 2018 – Cheyney left the PSAC to become an independent school without an affiliation with any athletic conference or any college sports organization, effective after the 2017–18 academic year. 
 2019 – Shepherd University joined the PSAC, effective in the 2019–20 academic year.

Notes

Member schools

Current members
The PSAC currently has 18 full members, all but three are public schools: 

Notes

Former member
The PSAC had one former full member, which was also a public school: 

Notes

Former affiliate members
The PSAC had one former affiliate member, which was also a private school: 

Note

Membership timeline

Sports

In wrestling; Bloomsburg, Clarion, Edinboro, and Lock Haven compete as members of the Division I Mid-American Conference. The PSAC held an annual championship open to all Division I and Division II teams, however with the transition of all of the former members of the Eastern Wrestling League into the MAC starting in 2019 the Division I level PSAC programs will focus on Division I level competition. The PSAC offers championships in the following sports.

Men's sponsored sports by school

Women's sponsored sports by school

Other sponsored sports by school

In addition to the above:
 Edinboro sponsors coeducational varsity teams in esports and wheelchair basketball.
 Gannon recognizes its cheerleaders (both male and female) and all-female dance team as varsity athletes.
 Mansfield fields a varsity team in sprint football, a weight-restricted form of football played under standard NCAA rules but governed outside the NCAA.
 Mercyhurst sponsors two separate teams in the non-NCAA sport of men's rowing—one heavyweight and one lightweight.
 Shepherd and West Chester recognize their female cheerleaders, but not their male ones, as varsity athletes.

Championships

Conference venues

Notable alumni

The following is a list of alumni of the respective universities, including before the formation of the Conference in 1951.

Football
Jason Capizzi, Indiana, former Pittsburgh Panthers offensive tackle
Curt Cignetti, Indiana, former University of Alabama recruiting coordinator, current James Madison University head coach
Frank Cignetti, Jr., Indiana, former University of Pittsburgh offensive coordinator
Frank Cignetti, Sr., Indiana, former IUP and West Virginia University head coach, 1991 Division II Coach of the Year
Rob Davis, Shippensburg, former NFL long snapper, current director of player development for the Green Bay Packers
Doug Dennison, Kutztown, former NFL running back
Jahri Evans, Bloomsburg, offensive guard for the New Orleans Saints
Lawson Fiscus, Indiana, early professional football player
John Glenn, (American Football Coach) East Stroudsburg Seattle Seahawks Linebackers Coach
David Green, Edinboro, former CFL running back, 1979 CFL's Most Outstanding Player
Kris Griffin, Indiana, former NFL linebacker
Brent Grimes, Shippensburg, former NFL cornerback
Bruce Harper, Kutztown, former running back/returner for the New York Jets
Trevor Harris, Edinboro, quarterback for the Ottawa Redblacks
Jim Haslett, Indiana, former linebacker for the Buffalo Bills and New York Jets and head coach for the New Orleans Saints and St. Louis Rams
Jack Henry, Indiana, former NFL assistant coach
Greg Hopkins, Slippery Rock, former Arena Football League player
Kevin Ingram, West Chester, wide receiver/defensive back for the Los Angeles Avengers
Mike Jemison, Indiana, former NFL and NFL Europe running back
Leander Jordan, Indiana, former NFL offensive tackle
Matt Kinsinger, Slippery Rock, fullback/linebacker for the Chicago Rush
John Kuhn, Shippensburg, fullback for the Green Bay Packers
Chuck Klausing, Indiana, College Football Hall of Fame, 1998 Class
Bob Ligashesky Indiana, Pittsburgh Steelers special teams coach
LeRon McCoy, Indiana, former NFL wide receiver
Dewey McDonald, California, safety for the Indianapolis Colts
Rontez Miles, California, current safety for the New York Jets
John Mobley, Kutztown, former linebacker for the Denver Broncos
Kevin O'Dea, Lock Haven, former New York Jets special teams coordinator
Akwasi Owusu-Ansah, Indiana, firmer Dallas Cowboys wide receiver
Ken Parrish, East Stroudsburg, former NFL punter
Dan Radakovich, Indiana, Georgia Tech athletic director
Andre Reed, Kutztown, Hall of Fame NFL wide receiver for the Buffalo Bills and the Washington Redskins
Robb Riddick, Millersville, former running back for the Buffalo Bills
Sean Scott, Millersville, wide receiver/linebacker for the Philadelphia Soul
Joe Senser, West Chester, former tight end for the Minnesota Vikings
Ralph Tamm, West Chester, former NFL offensive guard
Jimmy Terwilliger, East Stroudsburg, quarterback, 2005 Harlon Hill Trophy winner
Bob Tucker, Bloomsburg, former NFL tight end
Chris Villarrial, Indiana, former NFL offensive guard
Andre Waters, Cheyney, former NFL defensive back
Reggie Wells, Clarion, current NFL free agent, drafted as an offensive tackle for the Arizona Cardinals
James Williams, Cheyney, former offensive tackle for the Chicago Bears
Lee Woodall, West Chester, former NFL linebacker
Josh Portis, California, Seattle Seahawks quarterback
Dominique Curry, California, St. Louis Rams wide receiver
Terrence Johnson, California, Indianapolis Colts cornerback
Derrick Jones, California, Oakland Raiders wide receiver
Gene Carpenter, Millersville, former head coach of Millersville
Brent Grimes, Shippensburg, cornerback for the Atlanta Falcons
James Franklin, East Stroudsburg, head coach for the Pennsylvania State University

Baseball
Clyde Barnhart, Shippensburg, former World Series-winning outfielder for the Pittsburgh Pirates.
Tom Brookens, Mansfield, former MLB third baseman
Mark Corey, Edinboro, former MLB pitcher
Ryan Vogelsong, Kutztown, MLB pitcher
Pete Vukovich, Clarion, MLB Pitcher, Cy Young Winner-Brewers
Matt Adams, Slippery Rock, First Baseman for the St. Louis Cardinals in the MLB.
Pat Kelly, West Chester, former MLB infielder, New York Yankees
Joey Wendle, West Chester, MLB Infielder, Tampa Bay Rays
Dan Altavilla, Mercyhurst, MLB Pitcher, Seattle Mariners
Lou Trivino, Slippery Rock, MLB Pitcher, Oakland Athletics
Matt Festa, East Stroudsburg, MLB Pitcher, Seattle Mariners
Chas McCormick, Millersville, reigning World Series-Champion outfielder for the Houston Astros.
Tim Mayza, Millersville, MLB Pitcher, Toronto Blue Jays

Basketball
Geno Auriemma, West Chester, women's head coach at Connecticut; member of the Naismith Memorial Basketball Hall of Fame and Women's Basketball Hall of Fame
Del Beshore, California, former NBA point guard
John Calipari, Clarion, Kentucky men's head coach, 1996 and 2008 Naismith College Coach of the Year, member of the Naismith Hall of Fame
Stephen Dennis, Kutztown, Division II Player of the Year and professional player
Mel Hankinson, Indiana, former college basketball coach including Liberty
Jodi Kest, Slippery Rock, Akron women's basketball head coach
C. Vivian Stringer, Slippery Rock, women's head coach at Rutgers; member of the Naismith and Women's Halls of Fame

Soccer
Nicholas Addlery, California, forward currently for the Puerto Rico Islanders and the Jamaica national team
Raymond Bernabei, Indiana, National Intercollegiate Soccer Officials Association and National Soccer Hall of Fame
Jay Hoffman, East Stroudsburg, head coach of the 1999 U.S. women's Pan American Games gold medal team, and assistant coach of the 1999 U.S. FIFA Women's World Cup gold medal team
Bob Rigby, East Stroudsburg, former goalkeeper in the North American Soccer League and the U.S. national team

Olympians
Kurt Angle, Clarion, 1996 Summer Olympics wrestling gold medalist
Steve Spence, Shippensburg, former Olympic long-distance runner
Cary Kolat, Lock Haven, 2000 Summer Olympics Freestyle Wrestling - 9th
Stan Dziedzic, Slippery Rock, 1976 Summer Olympics wrestling bronze medalist

See also

Pennsylvania Collegiate Athletic Association

References

External links

 
College sports in Pennsylvania
Sports organizations established in 1951
1951 establishments in Pennsylvania